The Bahrain Ministry of Interior Tennis Challenger is a professional tennis tournament played on outdoor hard courts and it's held in Manama, Bahrain, where it is organized by the Public Security Sports Association. The first edition of the tournament was played in 2021.

Past finals

Singles

Doubles

References

External links 
Official website
ATP Challenger website

ATP Challenger Tour
Hard court tennis tournaments
Sport in Manama
Recurring sporting events established in 2021